The Capt. Archibald S. McKennon House is a historic house at 215 North Central Street in Clarksville, Arkansas.  It is a two-story masonry structure, built of brick laid in common bond and covered by a flat roof.  A two-story portico extends across its front, supported by slender tapered square columns.  It was built in 1868 for a Confederate Army veteran and prominent local businessman and lawyer.

The house was listed on the National Register of Historic Places in 1976.

See also
National Register of Historic Places listings in Johnson County, Arkansas

References

Houses on the National Register of Historic Places in Arkansas
National Register of Historic Places in Johnson County, Arkansas
Houses completed in 1868
Buildings and structures in Johnson County, Arkansas